Phantasmagoria is the sixth album by U.K. punk rock band the Damned, released by MCA in July 1985. Special editions were available on white vinyl or picture disc; some versions included a free 12-inch of their No. 3 hit "Eloise". It is the first album by the band without original member Captain Sensible, and was a style shift to gothic rock compared to the band's punk sound of its early and later career.

History
After much wrangling, the Damned received a new contract with MCA Records in October 1984 on the strength of the song "Grimly Fiendish",<ref>"Smashing It Up: A Decade of Chaos with the Damned by Kieron Tyler</ref> issued as a single the following March. They recorded the album in Eel Pie Studios from March to June 1985. It reached No. 11 in the charts, and was the band's highest-charting album ever, until the release of Evil Spirits'' in 2018, which cracked the top-ten at No. 7. The non-album single "Eloise," (a Barry Ryan cover), released six months later, became a huge UK hit, reaching No. 3.

The Damned centred the entire album around David Vanian's deep voice, giving much of the album a gothic feeling. The album was remastered and reissued by Geffen Records in Japan in 2007, featuring replicas of the LP's outer and inner sleeves and a CD label resembling the white vinyl edition. In 2009, an expanded edition was issued by Universal Music Group in Europe.

Artwork
The cover image of Susie Bick was taken by photographer Bob Carlos Clarke at Kensal Green Cemetery, Harrow Road.

Track listing 

Note

 The non-album single "Eloise" appeared as a bonus track on the 1986 re-issued LP versions in Australia, Germany and Italy.

2009 expanded edition 

Notes

 "Edward the Bear" (single version) is produced by Bob Sargeant and the Damned.
 "Nightshift" and "Would You" are produced by the Damned.
 "Let There Be Rats" and "Wiped Out" were originally released as a Rat Scabies 7" solo single in 1984; produced by Will Birch.
 Live tracks recorded at Woolwich Coronet, 11 July 1985; engineered and mixed by Jon Kelly; all tracks feature Paul Shepley on keyboards; "Pretty Vacant"and "Wild Thing" features Rat Scabies on guitar and Roman Jugg on drums.
 "The Shadow of Love", "Is It a Dream" and "Street of Dreams" recorded for Janice Long Session, 14 April 1985; produced by Harry Parked, engineered by Barry Adams and Peter Watts.

Personnel
The Damned
 Dave Vanian – lead vocals
 Roman Jugg – guitar, keyboards, lead vocals (7), backing vocals
 Bryn Merrick – bass, backing vocals
 Rat Scabies – drums
 Additional musicians
Paul Shepley – additional keyboards (8) 
 Andy Richards – additional keyboards
 Luís Jardim – percussion
 Gary Barnacle – saxophone and brass
 Steve Nieve – keyboard inspiration (4)
Production
 Jon Kelly – production, engineering (except 6)
 Chris Ludwinsky – additional engineering
 Bob Sargeant – production (6)
 The Damned – production (6)
 Bob Carlos Clarke – cover photography
 Booce – cover artwork

References

1985 albums
Albums produced by Jon Kelly
Albums produced by Bob Sargeant
The Damned (band) albums
Gothic rock albums by English artists